The Horseshoe Curve is Trey Anastasio's sixth studio album.  It was his second release on his record label, Rubber Jungle Records.  The Horseshoe Curve is entirely instrumental apart from three cries of "Burlap Sack & Pumps" on track 3 of the same name. This album features the ten-member dectet that toured from 2002 to 2004.

The album was primarily recorded at The Barn, Anastasio's recording studio near Burlington, Vermont, and Trout Recording in Brooklyn, New York.  "The 5th Round" and the title track were recorded live during the band's summer 2002 tour.

Track listing
All songs, unless otherwise noted, are written and arranged by Trey Anastasio

Sidewalks of San Francisco - 4:06 (Anastasio/Markellis/Lawton)
Olivia - 8:22 (Anastasio/Baptista)
Burlap Sack & Pumps - 6:58 (Anastasio/Markellis/Lawton/Kevin Hoffman)
The 5th Round - 6:19
Recorded live 6/21/02, Tweeter Center at the Waterfront, Camden, NJ
This track is a portion of the "Money, Love and Change" jam
The Horseshoe Curve - 6:20 (Anastasio/Markellis/Lawton)
Recorded live 6/11/02, Amphitheatre at Station Square, Pittsburgh, PA
This track is a portion of the "Last Tube" jam
Noodle Rave - 5:14
Tube Top Tony - 3:34
Porters Pyramids - 2:53

Personnel
Andy Moroz - Trombone
Cyro Baptista - percussion
Dave Grippo - alto/baritone saxophone
Jennifer Hartswick - trumpet
Peter Apfelbaum - tenor/baritone saxophone
Russell Remington - tenor saxophone/flute
Ray Paczkowski - keyboards
Russ Lawton - drums
Tony Markellis - bass
Trey Anastasio - guitar, vocals

Credits
Recorded and Mixed by Bryce Goggin
Additional Recording by Paul Languedoc
Mastered by Fred Kevorkian
Artwork by Scott Lenhardt

References

External links
Trey Anastasio's official website'
Phish's official website

2007 albums
Trey Anastasio albums
Instrumental albums